John Ackerman may refer to:

John B. Ackerman (1909–1981), Vice Director of the National Security Agency and United States Air Force officer
John M. Ackerman (born 1973), Mexican professor and writer
John William Ackerman (1825–1905), mayor of Pietermaritzsburg
John Yonge Akerman (1806–1873), English antiquarian and numismatist

See also
Ackerman (surname)